Iganga–Kaliro–Pallisa Road is a road in the Eastern Region of Uganda, connecting the towns of Iganga in Iganga District to Kaliro in Kaliro District and Pallisa in Pallisa District.

Overview

In February 2014, the president of Uganda indicated that government had plans to upgrade this road section to class 2 bituminous surface. In December 2014, this road section appeared on the list of upcoming national road projects released by the Uganda National Roads Authority (UNRA).

See also
 List of roads in Uganda

References

External links
 Website of Uganda National Roads Authority

Roads in Uganda
Iganga District
Kaliro District
Pallisa District